Ethan Skip Erickson (born August 5, 1973) is an American television and film actor and TV host.

Education
Erickson was born in Minneapolis, Minnesota. He has a degree in English literature from UC Santa Barbara.

Career
Erickson once played the recurring role in Buffy the Vampire Slayer as jock Percy West, who actress Alyson Hannigan's character Willow Rosenberg tutors.  He appeared in both season 3 and season 4 as the same character.  As a gymnast since age 8, Erickson reportedly won the part after impressing director/creator Joss Whedon with a backflip during his audition. He starred in Jawbreaker (1999) with Rose McGowan and Julie Benz, as well as The In Crowd, and played as A.J. Chamberlain on Guiding Light.

In 2006, he hosted a short-lived series on UPN called Get This Party Started with Kristin Cavallari of Laguna Beach fame. That same year, he starred in Fashion House on MyNetworkTV as scheming senior designer and blackmailer John Cotter which aired in 2006 in the U.S.

In April 2008, he briefly stepped into the role of Dr. Patrick Drake on the ABC Daytime soap opera General Hospital, while actor Jason Thompson had to take a medical leave of absence.

In the fall of that same year, his role on CSI: NY as firefighter Brendon Walsh, boyfriend to Detective Stella Bonasera (Melina Kanakaredes), was upgraded to recurring. In December 2008 he played a doctor again on an episode of The Starter Wife. In January 2009, Erickson guest-starred on Monk as star quarterback David Gitelson. In May 2009 he was reportedly cast as Britney Spears' love interest in her video "Radar". Two months later, both Erickson and Spears were seen in an ad for Candie's, a young women's fashion line.

Later that year, Erickson was cast in the 2009 Melrose Place sequel, where he had a recurring role as executive chef and co-owner Marcello, in the restaurant where both Violet (Ashlee Simpson) and Auggie (Colin Egglesfield) work.  In addition, he was also the host and narrator of Chefs vs. City on Food Network for years 2009 and 2010.

In 2010, Erickson worked on the hit ABC drama Castle opposite Stana Katic and Nathan Fillion. Later that same year he guest-starred on the TNT network's show The Closer with actress Kyra Sedgwick.

Ethan played the lead role of character Eddie Avedon opposite Jennie Garth, Fred Willard, Zack Ward and Marilu Henner in a movie of the week for Hallmark Entertainment entitled Accidentally in Love, for release in 2011. In the romantic comedy, co-written by Garth's former husband and Twilight actor Peter Facinelli, Erickson portrays a struggling, jaded actor who secretly plays a costumed character on a children's TV show. His outlook on life begins to transform as he realizes his work and life have a bigger meaning when he falls for the mother of a fan of his show. In 2011, Erickson worked with Anne Heche and Eriq LaSalle on the mini-series Blackout.

Filmography

References

External links
 Ethan Erickson: Acting credits
 

1973 births
American male film actors
American male stage actors
American male soap opera actors
American male television actors
American gymnasts
University of California, Santa Barbara alumni
American male voice actors
Living people
Male actors from Minneapolis
Male models from Minnesota